Jab Murray (October 28, 1892 – April 28, 1958) was a player in the National Football League for the Green Bay Packers and Racine Legion from 1921 to 1924. He played at the collegiate level at Marquette University.

Biography
Murray was born Richard John Murray on October 28, 1892 in Oconto, Wisconsin, the son of Joseph Keady Murray (an Irish native of New Brunswick) and Margaret (Long) Murray (daughter of a Scotch-Irish ship captain in New Brunswick). After his professional football and baseball (Minot, ND of the Class C Northern League) career, he was admitted to the bar in 1920 and practiced law in Marinette, was elected mayor nine times (18 years), and also served at various times as city attorney, district attorney, and member of the county board of supervisors,  the last for over 20 years.  He died April 28, 1958 in Marinette, survived by his wife, Marie (Cleary) Murray and son, Richard Murray.

See also
Green Bay Packers players

References

1892 births
1958 deaths
American football ends
American football centers
American football guards
American football offensive tackles
Green Bay Packers players
Racine Legion players
Marquette Golden Avalanche football players
People from Oconto, Wisconsin
Players of American football from Wisconsin
People from Marinette, Wisconsin